In music, Op. 104 stands for Opus number 104. Compositions that are assigned this number include:

 Beethoven – String Quintet, Op. 104
 Brahms – Fünf Gesänge, Op. 104
 Schumann – 7 Lieder
 Sibelius – Symphony No. 6